Bjarne Pedersen (born 18 January 1944) is a Danish rower. He competed in the men's coxed four event at the 1972 Summer Olympics. He is married to fellow rower Lotte Koefoed.

References

1944 births
Living people
Danish male rowers
Olympic rowers of Denmark
Rowers at the 1972 Summer Olympics
Place of birth missing (living people)